

See also
 List of Turkish exchange-traded funds

References
 BIST companies

 
Istanbul Stock Exchange
Istanbul